Ee Shatamaanada Veera Madakari (also known as Veera Madakari) is a 2009 Indian Kannada-language action film directed by Sudeep. The film features Sudeep in a double role alongside debutant Ragini Dwivedi in the lead roles. The film features a background score and soundtrack composed by M. M. Keeravani and produced by Dinesh Gandhi. The film was released on 20 March 2009. This film is the remake of the Telugu blockbuster Vikramarkudu.

Plot 
The story of Ee Shatamaanada Veera Madakari revolves around Muttati Sathyaraju (Sudeep), a small-time conman, who is in love with Neeraja (Ragini Dwivedi). Madakari (also played by Sudeep), an honest police officer who is murdered by the villain, Babjee (Gopinath Bhat), his brother Titla (voice dubbed by Sudeep himself for this character) and his son Munna (Arun Sagar). After Madakari's death, Sathyaraju takes on Madakari's identity and takes revenge on the villains in the small village of Devgarh, terrorised by Babjee.

Cast 
 Sudeep as ACP Veera Madakari IPS and Muttati Sathyaraju
 Ragini Dwivedi as Neeraja Goswamy
 Gopinath Bhat as Babjee
 Tennis Krishna as Hosdoddi (Mutatti's aide)
 Devaraj as Commissioner
 Doddanna as Home Minister
 Dharma as Circle Inspector M. R. Shinde
 Arun Sagar as Munna, babji's son and Titla’s nephew 
 Vanishri as Shinde's wife
 Mamta Mohandas as Madakari's wife (in the photo)
Suryanarayana waali as Titla bhai babji’s younger brother and Munna’s paternal uncle
Shailaja Joshi 
Thimme gowda 
Manmohan Rai 
K. V. Manjayya 
Jayashree Rao 
Dinesh Gandhi 
Arasu Maharaj 
Tumkur Mohan 
 
 Simran Khan in Special appearance in the song "Manjari Manjari"

Production 
Actor-director Sudeep is well known for making successful remakes, especially from Telugu language box-office hits. Sudeep in the film casts himself in two different roles and has also given his voice to some songs. The film, as a remake of Vikramarkudu, successfully maintains the original script of its Telugu counterpart.

Soundtrack 

The film has 6 songs.

Reception

Critical response 

R G Vijayasarathy of Rediff.com scored the film at 2.5 out of 5 stars and wrote "Besides Sudeep, the film's major attraction is child actor Joysha Christopher whose performance is superb. Newcomer Raagini is impressive while Gopinath and Soori are too loud. Tennis Krishna fits the bill. Dharma, Dinesh Gandhi and the Lady Inspector have all done a good job. Songs and camera work are good. Go for Veera Madakari only if you haven't seen the original". A critic from The New Indian Express wrote "Finally, Satyaraju goes to Chambal area in the guise of Madhakari and bashes the living daylights out of Babloo and his gang. The only disadvantage of t h i s f i l m is the length, d i rect o r Sudeep c o u l d trim it a little bit. But overall, a good entertainer for Sudeep’s fans". A critic from Bangalore Mirror wrote  "The tunes are the same as in Vikramarkudu and Rajesh Ramnath has done what he is best at; retaining original tunes for remake films. The only person for whom this film could have a positive impact is debutante Ragini. If you are not a hardcore fan of Sudeep, ready for anything, you are sure to come out of Veera Madakari with a headache". A critic from The Times of India scored the film at 3 out of 5 stars and says "When Madakari is killed by the goons, Sathyaraj who resembles Madakari, assumes his identity and eliminates the goons and restores peace to Devagarh. How does he do it? Sudeep excels in both roles. Tennis Krishna is impressive. Dharma proves he is good at sentimental roles too. Music director Keeravani fails to live up to his reputation".

Box office
Ee Shatamaanada Veera Madakari completed 100 days and it was blockbuster movie of 2009.

Awards 
2nd Suvarna Film Awards :-
 Favorite Hero - Winner - Sudeep
 Best Debut Actress - Winner - Ragini Dwivedi
 Best Choreographer - Nominated - Pradeep Antony 
 Star Pair of the Year - Nominated - Sudeep & Ragini Dwivedi

Zee Kannada Innovative Film Awards :-
 Special Jury Award - Winner - Sudeep
 Best Child Actor - Winner - Baby Jorusha 

South Scope Cine Awards :-
 Best Comedian Kannada - Nominated - Tennis Krishna

References

External links 
 

2009 films
2000s Kannada-language films
Films scored by M. M. Keeravani
Kannada remakes of Telugu films
Indian action films
2009 action films
2000s masala films
Fictional portrayals of the Karnataka Police
Indian police films
Films about lookalikes
2000s police films